The president of the Republic of Iraq is the head of state of Iraq and "safeguards the commitment to the Constitution and the preservation of Iraq's independence, sovereignty, unity, the security of its territories in accordance with the provisions of the Constitution". The president is elected by the Council of Representatives by a two-thirds majority, and is limited to two four-year terms. The president is responsible for ratifying treaties and laws passed by the Council of Representatives, issues pardons on the recommendation of the prime minister, and performs the "duty of the Higher Command of the armed forces for ceremonial and honorary purposes". Since the mid-2000s, the presidency is primarily a symbolic office, as the position does not possess significant power within the country according to the October 2005-adopted constitution. By convention, though not by any official legal requirement, the office is expected to be held by a Kurd (all were from PUK party).

On the 2022 Iraqi presidential election held on 13 October 2022, the Iraqi parliament voted Abdul Latif Rashid as the new president of Iraq, replacing Barham Salih.

Powers of the Iraqi President 
According to Article 73 of the Iraqi Constitution, the powers of the President are:

 Issuing a special pardon on the recommendation of the Prime Minister, with the exception of what is related to the private right, and those convicted of international crimes, terrorism, and financial and administrative corruption.

 Ratification of international treaties and agreements, after the approval of the House of Representatives, and they are considered ratified after fifteen days from the date of their receipt.

 Ratifiying and issuing laws enacted by the Council of Representatives, considered ratified after fifteen days from the date of their receipt.

 Calling the elected Council of Representatives to convene within a period not exceeding fifteen days from the date of ratification of the election results, and in other cases stipulated in the constitution.

 To award medals and medals upon the recommendation of the Prime Minister, in accordance with the law.

 Acceptance of ambassadors.

 Issuing republican decrees.

 To ratify death sentences issued by the competent courts.

 Performing the mission of the Supreme Command of the Armed Forces for honorary and ceremonial purposes.

 Exercising any other presidential powers stipulated in this constitution.

Conditions for running for the office of President 
The Iraqi constitution, in Article 68, specifies a number of conditions that a candidate for the presidential office must: 

 Be an Iraqi by birth and of Iraqi parents.

 Be fully qualified and has completed forty years of age.

 Have a good reputation, political experience, and is known for his integrity, uprightness, justice, and devotion to the homeland.

 Has not been convicted of a crime involving moral turpitude.

Presidential Palaces 
In the early days of the Iraqi Republic in 1958, neither the head of the Sovereign Council, Muhammad Najib al-Rubaie, nor the Prime Minister, Abdul Karim Qassem, took any palace to be an official republican palace for the state. Al-Rubaie stayed in his personal home before 14 July 1958. Qassem also remained in his home before the revolution, while his office at the Ministry of Defense was taken as his official office in his capacity as prime minister. Sometimes he slept there.

With Abd al-Salam's accession to power in 1963, he focused his attention on the palace that was being built during the reign of King Faisal II and in which he was to marry later.  Abd al-Salam took care of the palace and completed it in 1965, the first republican palace of Iraq.

And it continued as a republican palace until 2003, at the beginning of the American occupation of Iraq.

The American forces used it as a headquarters in the first days of the occupation, then made it into an American embassy until 1 January 2009, when the Iraqi government took over it, restored it and changed its name to the Government Palace. In 2012, the Arab summit postponed from last year was held in this palace 2011.

The current presidential palace in which the Iraqi president resides is the Peace Palace, which was built during the era of Saddam Hussein.  Another complex used as a presidential palace during Saddam Hussein's rule was the Radwaniyah presidential palace complex. In addition, there are a scattered number of presidential palaces in Baghdad and the rest of the provinces, such as the Sujood Palace and Al-Faw Palace in Baghdad, and the presidential palaces in Mosul, Basra, Tikrit and Babylon.

Presidents of Iraq 

After the revolution of 14 July 1958, elections were scheduled to be held to choose a President of the Republic, but they never took place.  Therefore, the position of the president remained suspended, while Najib al-Rubaie was assigned to head the Sovereignty Council, which was considered as the president of the republic. Thus, Abd al-Salam Aref became the first to bear the title of President of the Iraqi Republic.

Presidency Council 

The presidency council was an entity that operated under the auspices of the "transitional provisions" of the Constitution. According to the Constitution, the Presidency Council functioned in the role of the president until one successive term after the Constitution was ratified and a government was seated. The presidency council had the additional power to send legislation back to the Council of Representatives for revision.

See also 
 List of presidents of Iraq
 List of prime ministers of Iraq
 List of kings of Iraq

References 

Government of Iraq
 
1958 establishments in Iraq